Kaluđerski Skokovi is the highest waterfall in Serbia. It is located on the Stara Planina mountain in southeast Serbia.

Location 

The Kaluđerski Skokovi falls are situated in the area of the Topli Do village, northeast of the city of Pirot, to which it administratively belongs. The waterfall is located just southwest of the Midžor peak on the Stara Planina mountain, close to the border with Bulgaria.

Characteristics 

The waterfall is located on the river of Kaluđerska reka, which flows into the Rakitska reka, which in turn forms the Toplodolska reka with the Javorska reka.

On average, the inclination of the falls is 55 to 60 degrees, but some sections are almost straight, up to 90 degrees. It has over 20 cascades.

Accessibility 

The waterfall is hard to access. It is possible to reach it only in the early spring, while the region is still under snow, and with the full rock-climbing equipment. During summer, the already steep rocks grow into the thick, lush vegetation. Due to the topographic relief, Kaluđerski Skokovi in full can only be observed from the air.

History 

Dragovan Stojadinović, amateur explorer who discovered some of the highest waterfalls in Serbia, discovered the Kaluđerski skokovi in 2012. On 9 June 2012 professors from the University of Belgrade's Faculty of mining and geology and the Institute for nature conservation of Serbia measured the waterfall.

Developments in the recent two decades completely changed the geography of Serbia, when it comes to waterfalls. Area of the Stara Planina has always been sparsely populated and inaccessible because of the rugged and forested terrain, but also as a location of the Serbian-Bulgarian border. As armies gradually relinquished the borders keeping to the police, civilians were allowed to explore the area. As a result, higher and higher waterfalls have been discovered on the Serbian side of the Stara Planina since then: Čungulj in 1996 - ; Pilj in 2002 - ; Kopren in 2011 -  and Kaluđerski Skokovi in 2012 - .

References 

Waterfalls of Serbia